Dhanbad Assembly constituency   is an assembly constituency in  the Indian state of Jharkhand.

Members of Assembly 
2005: Pashupati Nath Singh, Bharatiya Janata Party
2009: Mannan Mallick, Indian National Congress
2014: Raj Sinha, Bharatiya Janata Party
2019: Raj Sinha, Bharatiya Janata Party

See also
Vidhan Sabha
List of states of India by type of legislature

References

Politics of Dhanbad district
Assembly constituencies of Jharkhand
Dhanbad